Patterns, also known as Patterns of Power, is a 1956 American "boardroom drama" film starring Van Heflin, Everett Sloane, and Ed Begley; and directed by Fielder Cook. The screenplay was by Rod Serling, who adapted it from his teleplay of the same name, which was originally broadcast January 12, 1955 on the Kraft Television Theatre with Sloane, Begley and Richard Kiley.

Plot
Ruthless Walter Ramsey runs Ramsey & Co., a Manhattan-based industrial empire he inherited from his father. He brings Fred Staples, a youthful industrial engineer whose performance at a company Ramsey has recently acquired has impressed him, in for a top executive job at the headquarters. Though Staples is initially clueless, Ramsey is grooming him to replace the aging Bill Briggs as the second in command at the company.

Briggs has been with the firm for decades, having worked for and admired the company's founder, Ramsey's father. His concern for the employees clashes repeatedly with Ramsey's ruthless methods. Ramsey will not fire Briggs outright but does everything in his power to sabotage and humiliate him into resigning. The old man stubbornly refuses to give in. Staples is torn by the messy situation, his ambition conflicting with his sympathy for Briggs.

The stress gets to Briggs, who collapses after a confrontation with Ramsey and later dies. This causes a heated showdown between Ramsey and Staples, in which Staples announces he is quitting. Ramsey rebukes him, asserting only men with his talent have what it takes to make a corporation like Ramsey & Company succeed. He offers Briggs' job and an enormous increase in salary to Staples, who resists. Ramsey increases the fever of his pitch, adding that Staples will never be able to reach his full potential anywhere else. Staples counters with double his salary, stock options, and the right to punch Ramsey in the jaw if he feels so inclined — adding that he will do all he can to replace him. Ramsey enthusiastically agrees to all of the conditions.

Cast

 Van Heflin as Fred Staples
 Everett Sloane as Walter Ramsey
 Ed Begley as William Briggs
 Beatrice Straight as Nancy Staples, Fred's wife
 Elizabeth Wilson as Marge Fleming, Briggs' loyal secretary, who is reassigned to Staples
 Joanna Roos as Miss Margaret Lanier, Ramsey's secretary
 Valerie Cossart as Miss Stevens
 Eleni Kiamos as Sylvia Trammel
 Ronnie Welsh as Paul Briggs, William's teenage son
 Shirley Standlee as Miss Hill
 Andrew Duggan as Mr. Jameson
 Jack Livesey as Mr. Vanderventer
 John Seymour as Mr. Gordon
 James Kelly as Mr. Latham
 John Shelly as Mr. Grannigan

Reception

Critical response
Film critic Dennis Schwartz gave the film an A and highly praised it in his 2002 Ozus review:
"Patterns is based on the teleplay of Rod Serling which was aired live on TV in January of 1955 on Kraft Television Theater, and was so-well received that it was repeated four weeks later. That was something not done during that period. This brilliant script by the creator of the Twilight Zone, Rod Serling, is considered by many as the finest piece of writing he has ever done and brought him instant acclaim. It is ably directed by Fielder Cook ... The ensemble cast is superb, with special kudos to Van Heflin, Ed Begley, Beatrice Straight and Everett Sloane. This is Van Heflin's finest role since Shane (1953)."

Added Schwartz: 
"It's a forceful melodrama, that takes the viewer into the pits of a big corporation's board room politics, backstabbing, and the tough way of doing business. Things have changed since the 1950s which make some things outdated, but the film still has its finger on the savage nature of the business world. Even when a company is not as corrupt as an Enron, people are still perceived as secondary to making a profit no matter what."

In the April 27, 2008, edition of TV Week, the television critic Tom Shales compared the movie unfavorably to the live TV production:
Some people thought live TV was the beginning of a truly new storytelling medium—one uniquely suited to intimate, unadorned, psychological dramas—but it turned out to be a beginning with a tiny middle and a rushed end... Patterns was so well-received that Kraft mounted a live repeat of the show a month later, and the intimate TV show was turned into a less intimate (and somehow less satisfying) movie in 1956. Except for the use of terms like “mimeographed” and “teletype,” little about the drama seems dated, unless one is of the opinion that corporate politics and boardroom bloodletting no longer exist... With minimally judicious scene-setting (shots of clocks, a building directory, a switchboard) and a rapid introduction of characters, Serling pulls a viewer almost immediately into his story, a tale of corporate morality—or the lack of it—and such everyday battles as the ones waged between conscience and ambition.

See also
List of American films of 1956

References

External links
 
 
 
 
 Patterns at the TCM Movie Database
 
 Patterns plot summary at Classic Film Guide

1956 films
1956 drama films
American business films
American drama films
American black-and-white films
Films about businesspeople
Films based on television plays
Films directed by Fielder Cook
Films set in New York City
Films with screenplays by Rod Serling
United Artists films
1956 directorial debut films
1950s English-language films
1950s American films